Prostanthera megacalyx is a species of flowering plant in the family Lamiaceae and is endemic to  Queensland. It is a small shrub with pale green leaves and mauve flowers.

Description
The branchlets and new growth covered with short, pale, stiff glandular hairs. The calyx dotted with small glands at irregular intervals.

Taxonomy and naming
Prostanthera megacalyx was first formally described in 1926 by Cyril Tenison White and William Douglas Francis and the description was published in Proceedings of the Royal Society of Queensland.The specific epithet (megacalyx) means "large calyx".

Distribution and habitat
This prostanthera grows in barren, dry, rocky sites at Grey Range, Ambethala Range, Eulo and Yowah in Queensland.

References

megacalyx
Flora of Queensland
Lamiales of Australia
Plants described in 1926